Heikki Huttunen (26 September 1880 – 21 September 1947) was a Finnish sport shooter who competed at the 1908, the 1912 and the 1924 Summer Olympics and won five Finnish national championship golds.

Shooting

Olympics

International 

Huttunen competed in the ISSF World Shooting Championships:
 1914: 5th in free rifle team
 1924: 7th in free rifle, standing

National 

Huttunen won five Finnish national championship golds:
 free rifle, standing: 1909, 1924
 free rifle, three positions: 1910, 1913
 free pistol: 1919

Other 

He represented the club Suomen Metsästysyhdistys.

He was present at the constitutive meeting of the Finnish Shooting Sport Federation, and became its board member.

He received the Medal of Merit in silver with golden cross of the Finnish Sport in 1947.

Cross-country skiing 

He competed at the 1901 and 1905 Nordic Games. In 1901, he placed 6th in the 30 kilometre cross-country skiing with time 2:27:29. In 1905, he placed 7th in the same event with time 2:41:55.

He was part of the team that won the first cross-country skiing relay race in Finland, which was from Helsinki to Porvoo in 1904. He also took part in the organizational activities of skiing in Finland in the 1900s and 1910s.

Sources

References

External links 

 

1880 births
1947 deaths
People from Siikalatva
Finnish male sport shooters
ISSF pistol shooters
ISSF rifle shooters
Olympic shooters of Finland
Shooters at the 1908 Summer Olympics
Shooters at the 1912 Summer Olympics
Shooters at the 1924 Summer Olympics
Sportspeople from North Ostrobothnia